Aliabad (also Romanized as ‘Alīābād, Also knows as Ālgowa) is a village in Qanibeyglu Rural District, Zanjanrud District, Zanjan County, Zanjan Province, Iran. At the 2006 census, its population was 335, in 81 families.

References 

Populated places in Zanjan County